Deh-e Shir-e Sofla (also Romanized as Deh-e Shīr-e Soflá and Deh Shīr-e Soflá; also known as Ardh-i-Shīr, Dehshīr, Deh Shīr-e Pā’īn, Dehshīr-e Soflá, Deshīr Pā’īn, Deshīr Soflā, and Karagez) is a village in Qoltuq Rural District, in the Central District of Zanjan County, Zanjan Province, Iran. At the 2006 census, its population was 81, in 20 families.

References 

Populated places in Zanjan County